Ronnie Scott's Presents Sarah Vaughan Live, also known as Sassy at Ronnie's, is a 1977 live album by American jazz singer Sarah Vaughan.

Track listing
Introduction by Ronnie Scott
"Here's That Rainy Day"
"Like Someone in Love"
"Feelings"
"I'll Remember April"
"Sophisticated Lady"
"If You Could See Me Now"
"Start Believing Me Now"
"My Funny Valentine"
"A Foggy Day"
"Send In The Clowns"
"Tenderly"

Personnel
Sarah Vaughan – vocals
Carl Shroeder – piano
Jimmy Cobb – drums
Walter Booker – bass

References

Sarah Vaughan live albums
Albums recorded at Ronnie Scott's Jazz Club
1977 live albums
Pye Records live albums